Duchy of Syrmia or Syrmian Duchy may refer to:

 Syrmian Duchy of Sermon, a duchy in the region of Syrmia, ruled by duke Sermon (c. 1018)
 Syrmian Duchy of John Angelos, a duchy in the region of Syrmia, ruled by duke John Angelos (first half of the 13th century)
 Syrmian Duchy of Radoslav Čelnik, a duchy in the region of Syrmia, ruled by duke Radoslav Čelnik (c. 1527-1530)
 Syrmian Duchy of the Odescalchi, designation for feudal domain of Odescalchi ducal family in the region of Syrmia

See also
 Syrmia (disambiguation)
 Byzantine Syrmia (disambiguation)